The Ultimate Collection (subtitled Celebrating Four Decades of Soul) is the fourth greatest hits album by Australian musician Renée Geyer. It was released in March 2010 by Warner Music Australia and peaked at number 21 on the RIANZ charts, becoming Geyer's highest charting album in New Zealand.

Background and release 
Geyer's career has spanned four decades and has achieved commercial success, appearing on the Australian charts since the 1970s to 2000s. The 17 tracks were selected by Geyer. She believes that they are fan favourites and are always requested at live shows. In 2005, Geyer was inducted into the ARIA Hall of Fame.

In a 2011 interview with Bendigo Weekly, Geyer said "People like it (the album) because it's the songs that I know are the most yelled out for me. I know these are the ones that people really want to hear. It's a basic sum-up of my career."

Reception 
Julie Taylor from The Northern Advocate gave the album 3 out of 5 saying; "Her best known hit, Eddy Grant's "Say I Love You", is an essential, but somewhat out of place, inclusion in this collection of soulful classics. The more emotionally infused tracks such as "It's a Man's Man's World", "If Loving You Is Wrong" and "Love Don't Live Here Anymore" are artfully performed and wrench, rather than tug, on the heart strings. There are also lighter moments with "Shaky Ground" and a cover of "Prince's "Thieves in the Temple". Geyer has a strong voice and knows how to use it to full effect."

Track listing

Weekly charts

Release history

References

2010 greatest hits albums
Renée Geyer albums
Compilation albums by Australian artists